Átila Iório (1 April 1921 – 10 December 2002) was a Brazilian actor. He appeared in 48 films and television shows between 1946 and 1997. He starred in the 1964 film Os Fuzis, which won the Silver Bear Extraordinary Jury Prize at the 14th Berlin International Film Festival.

Partial filmography

 Caídos do Céu (1946) - Roberto Boaventura
 Também Somos Irmãos (1949) - Delegado
 The Terrible Twosome (1953)
 A Baronesa Transviada (1957) - Lover in the movie
 Os Três Cangaceiros (1959)
 Virou Bagunça (1960) - Detective
 Os Dois Ladrões (1960) - Delegado
 Briga, Mulher e Samba (1960) - Valentino
 O Assalto ao Trem Pagador (1962) - Tonho
 Os Cosmonautas (1962) - Zeca
 Sonhando com Milhões (1963) - Arquimedes
 Barren Lives (1963) - Fabiano
 Quero Essa Mulher Assim Mesmo (1963)
 The Guns (1964) - Gaúcho
 Lana, Queen of the Amazons (1964) - Black guide / Casanova
 Um Morto ao Telefone (1964)
 007 1/2 no Carnaval (1966)
 Panca de Valente (1968)
 As Aventuras de Chico Valente (1968)
 Os Carrascos Estão Entre Nós (1968) - Krueger
 No Paraíso das Solteironas (1969) - Delegado
 Deu a Louca no Cangaço (1969)
 2000 Anos de Confusão (1969) - Ricardo Montebello
 A Guerra dos Pelados (1970)
 O Libertino (1973) - Dr. Mascarenhas
 Sagarana: The Duel (1974)
 Uma Tarde Outra Tarde (1974)
 O Filho do Chefão (1974)
 Ódio (1977) - Geraldão
 Ouro Sangrento (1977)
 Diário da Província (1978)
 O Sol dos Amantes (1979)
 The Emerald Forest (1985) - Trader
 Pedro Mico (1985)
 O Mistério de Robin Hood (1990)
 O Rei do Gado (1996, TV Series) - Caiçara
 Anjo Mau (1997, TV Series) - Josias

References

External links

1921 births
2002 deaths
Brazilian male film actors
Male actors from Rio de Janeiro (city)